is a Japanese actress, voice actress and singer from Tokyo. She is affiliated with Sigma Seven. She voices Rei Kuki in Genji Tsuushin Agedama, Natsumi Tsujimoto in You're Under Arrest, Kazama's mother in Crayon Shin-chan, and Toyama-san in Atashin'chi. Other roles of note include Pirotess in Record of Lodoss War, Cocoa in NG Knight Ramune & 40, Tachikoma in Ghost in the Shell: Stand Alone Complex, Rouge in Starship Girl Yamamoto Yohko, Juiz in Eden of the East, and Jasmine in Cross Ange.

Filmography

Anime
{| class="wikitable sortable plainrowheaders"
|+ List of voice performances in anime
! Year
! Series
! Role
! class="unsortable"| Notes
! class="unsortable"| Source
|-
|  || Fuusen no Doratoraou:ja:フーセンのドラ太郎 || Madonna || Debut role ||
|-
|  || Galaxy Cyclone Braiger || Stella Russell || ||
|-
|  || Lucy of the Southern Rainbow || Clara Poppuru || ||
|-
|  || Sasuga no Sarutobi:ja:さすがの猿飛 || Chiaki || ||
|-
|  || Miyuki || Michiko Yamamoto || ||
|-
|  || Lady Georgie || Elise || ||
|-
|  || Plawres Sanshiro || Maki Asano || ||
|-
|  || Lupin III Part III || Flora Hirst || ||
|-
|  || Bismark || Yvette || ||
|-
|  || Greed || Lar Lipp || OAV ||
|-
| –86 || Area 88 || Ryoko Tsukumo || OVA ||
|-
|  || Call Me Tonight || Rumi Natsumi || OVA ||
|-
|  || Maryuu Senki || Shiho Murase || ||
|-
|  || City Hunter || Denai || ||
|-
|  || Esper Mami || Natsuko, Koji's mother || ||
|-
|  || Grimm's Fairy Tale Classics || Snow White || ||
|-
|  || Battle Royal High School || Ryoko Takayanagi || OVA ||
|-
|  || Daimajū Gekitō: Hagane no Oni || Rui || OVA ||
|-
|  || F || Junko Komori || ||
|-
|  || What's Michael? || Shino || ||
|-
|  || Oishinbo || Umebi Shu 周梅美 || ||
|-
|  || Dragon Century || Harumi || ||
|-
|  || Armor Hunter Mellowlink || Lulucy Ramon || OVA ||
|-
|  || Legend of Heavenly Sphere Shurato || Sati || ||
|-
|  || Jungle Emperor Leo || Raiya || ||
|-
|  || Chinpui:ja:チンプイ || Jarashi || ||
|-
|  || Shutendoji || Sonya Costello || OAV ||
|-
|  || Kyatto Ninden Teyandee || Okinu || ||
|-
|  || NG Knight Ramune & 40 || Cocoa || ||
|-
|  || Moomin || Arisa || ||
|-
|  || Magical Angel Sweet Mint || Nuts, Pepporin || ||
|-
|  || Record of Lodoss War ||  Pirotess || ||
|-
|  || Nineteen 19 || Eiko || OVA ||
|-
| –91 || The Hakkenden || Hinagiru || OAV ||
|-
|  || Carol || Fairy || ||
|-
|  || Adventures of the Little Mermaid || Ridley || ||
|-
|  || Jankenman || Jankenman mother, Jankenman's grandmother || ||
|-
|  || Sukoshi Fushigi:ja:藤子・F・不二雄のSF短編 || Midori Fukami || OVA ep. 4 ||
|-
|  || Akai Hayate || Shiori || OAV ||
|-
|  || Oniisama e... || Mariko Shinobu ||  ||
|-
|  || Sohryuden: Legend of the Dragon Kings || Toba Matsuri || OAV ||
|-
|  || Handsome na Kanojo || Mio Hagiwara || ||
|-
|  || Genji Tsūshin Agedama || Rei Kuki || ||
|-
|  || Floral Magician Mary Bell || Remi, Julia || ||
|-
|  || Ooi! Adatchiおーい！アダッチー || Akko || OVA ||
|-
|  || Crayon Shin-chan || Kazama's mother || ||
|-
|  || Ashita e Free Kick || Kanae Godai, Jun Sugiyama || ||
|-
|  || Kamasutra || Princess Surya || OVA ||
|-
|  || Jeanie with the Light Brown Hair || Kanna || ||
|-
|  || Gakusaver || Susan Walker || ||
|-
|  || Idol Defense Force Hummingbird ||  Kanna Toreishi || ||
|-
|  || Sailor Moon S || Elsa Gray || ||
|-
|  || Haō Taikei Ryū Knight || Yellow / Rara Hao || ||
|-
|  || New Cutie Honey || Death Star || Ep. 1 ||
|-
|  || Haō Taikei Ryū Knight: Adeu's Legend || Malto || ||
|-
|  || Samurai Shodown || Charlotte || ||
|-
|  || Blue Seed || Sakura Yamazaki || ||
|-
|  || DNA2 || Lulara Kawasaki || OAV ||
|-
|  || Sins of the Sisters || Kozue Takemiya || ||
|-
|  || Black Jack || Ikehata Himegimi, Mrs. Taneda || OAV ep. 6 ||
|-
| –97 || Sorcerer Hunters || Daughter (Dotter), Rin, Meriina || TV series and OVAs ||
|-
|  || Golden Boy || Reiko Terayama || OAV ||
|-
|  || Haō Taikei Ryū KnightL Adeu's Legend II || Sophie || ||
|-
|  || Case Closed || Yoshimi, Akemi Miyano || Ep. 6, 129 ||
|-
|  || Sailor Moon Sailor Stars || Princess Kakyuu || ||
|-
|  || VS Knight Ramune & 40 Fire || Cocoa || ||
|-
|  || Legend of Crystania: The Chaos Ring || Sheru / Pirotess || ||
|-
|  || You're Under Arrest || Natsumi Tsujimoto || ||
|-
|  || Jewel BEM Hunter Lime ||  Lime || ||
|-
|  || Pokémon || Jiiku || ||
|-
|  || Kindaichi Case Files || Hijirimasa Eiko || ||
|-
| –99 || Agent Aika || Meipia Arukimetaria || ||
|-
|  || El-Hazard: The Alternative World || Gilda Hasteroff || ||
|-
|  || Cyber Team in Akihabara || Miyama Soshigaya (Death Crow) || ||
|-
|  || Orphen || Stephanie || ||
|-
|  || Eatman '98 || Eimi || ||
|-
|  || Fushigi Mahou Fan Fan Pharmacy || Potpourri || ||
|-
|  || Legend of Galactic Heroes || Fia Von Kliengalt || ||
|-
|  || Space Pirate Mito || Sobo || ||
|-
|  || Starship Girl Yamamoto Yohko || Rouge || ||
|-
|  || A.D. Police || Youko Takagi || OAV Ep.3 ||
|-
|  || Space Pirate Mito || Sobo || ||
|-
|  || Zoids: Chaotic Century || Carol || ||
|-
| –2000 || The Big O || Cybele Rohan || ||
|-
|  || Shūkan Storyland || Mary, Kyoko Hasegawa, Reiko Ota || ||
|-
|  || Daa! Daa! Daa! || Hitomida Saionji || ||
|-
|  || Hajime no Ippo || Aiko Date || ||
|-
|  || Zoids: New Century Zero || Pierce || ||
|-
|  || You're Under Arrest: Second Season || Natsumi Tsujimoto || ||
|-
|  || Mistin (Kasumin):ja:カスミン || Choko || ||
|-
|  || Mirage of Blaze || Ayako Kadowaki || ||
|-
|  || Tenchi Muyo! GXP || Airi Masaki || ||
|-
|  || Daigunder || Powaru || ||
|-
|  || Atashin'chi || Toyama-san || ||
|-
|  || Samurai Deeper Kyo || Shatora || ||
|-
|  || Ghost in the Shell: Stand Alone Complex || Tachikoma, Uchikoma || ||
|-
|  || Midnight Horror School || Onpu, Watt || ||
|-
|  || Mouse || Doctor || TV Ep. 7–8 ||
|-
|  || .hack//Legend of the Twilight || Kamui || ||
|-
|  || D.N. Angel || Emiko Niwa || ||
|-
|  || Astro Boy || Nicole || Ep. 43 ||
|-
|  || Rumic Theater || Yuko Haga || TV ep. 1 ||
|-
|  || Ghost in the Shell: S.A.C. 2nd GIG || Tachikoma, Uchikoma || ||
|-
|  || Kaiketsu Zorori || Mama Zorori || ||
|-
|  || Mars Daybreak || Anna Grace || ||
|-
|  || Sgt. Frog || Fake Celeb Alien || TV ep 224 ||
|-
|  || Phoenix || Hinaku || ||
|-
|  || Samurai Champloo || Sarah || ||
|-
|  || Agatha Christie's Great Detectives Poirot and Marple || Kopuringu || ||
|-
|  || Fafner in the Azure: Dead Aggressor || Ayano Kondo || ||
|-
|  || Yakitate! Japan || Monica's mother || ||
|-
|  || Majime ni Fumajime: Kaiketsu Zorori || Mama Zorori || ||
|-
|  || Aquarion || Sofia Blanc || ||
|-
|  || Eureka Seven || Diane Thurston || ||
|-
|  || Gunparade March || Saika Murata || ||
|-
|  || Minami no shima no chīsana hikōki bādī':ja:南の島の小さな飛行機 バーディー || Minami Hoeru || ||
|-
|  || Fafner in the Azure: Right of Left || Ayano Kondo || ||
|-
|  || Simoun || Onashia || ||
|-
|  || Witchblade || Rie Nishida || ||
|-
|  || xxxHolic || Mayuko || ||
|-
|  || Tsubasa Reservoir Chronicle || Kurogane's mother|| TV, second series ||
|-
|  || Ghost in the Shell: Stand Alone Complex - Solid State Society || Tachikoma, Uchikoma || ||
|-
|  || The Galaxy Railways: Crossroads to Eternity || Adele || ||
|-
|  || Hell Girl: Two Mirrors || Harumi Kanno || ||
|-
|  || Tōka Gettan || Kiba Yuki || ||
|-
|  || Devil May Cry || Sara || ||
|-
|  || You're Under Arrest: Full Throttle || Natsumi Tsujimoto || ||
|-
|  || Mobile Suit Gundam 00 || Lewis's mother || ||
|-
|  || Ghost Hound || Miki Komori, Security robot || ||
|-
|  || Yes! PreCure 5 GoGo! || Montblanc || ||
|-
|  || Kaiba || Negi || ||
|-
|  || Hajime no Ippo: New Challenger || Aiko Date || ||
|-
|  || Genji Monogatari Sennenki || Fujitsubo || ||
|-
|  || Eden of the East || Juiz || ||
|-
|  || GA Geijutsuka Art Design Class || Health Teacher || ||
|-
|  || Darker than Black: Gemini of the Meteor || Asako Makimiya || ||
|-
|  || Heartcatch Pretty Cure || Rumi Shiku || ||
|-
|  || Dragon Crisis! || Hanewa Kirasagi || ||
|-
|  || Shōwa Monogatari || Kanoko Yamazaki || ||
|-
|  || From the New World || Minoshiro Modoki || ||
|-
| -18 || Yo-kai Watch || Satoko Hayashi ||
|-
| –15 || Cross Ange ||  Jasmine || ||
|-
|  || Breakers ||  Jasmine || ||
|-
|  || Ghost in the Shell: SAC_2045 || Tachikoma || ||
|-

|-
|}

Theatrical animation

Video games

Audio dramas

Dubbing roles

References

 Nakagami, Yoshikatsu et al. "You're Under Arrest: Full Throttle". (December 2007) Newtype USA''. pp. 48–49.

External links
 Official agency profile 
 

1962 births
Living people
Japanese child actresses
Japanese women pop singers
Japanese radio personalities
Japanese video game actresses
Japanese voice actresses
Sigma Seven voice actors
Singers from Tokyo
Voice actresses from Tokyo
20th-century Japanese actresses
20th-century Japanese women singers
20th-century Japanese singers
21st-century Japanese actresses
21st-century Japanese women singers
21st-century Japanese singers